The 2006 Potters Holidays World Indoor Bowls Championship  was held at Potters Leisure Resort, Hopton on Sea, Great Yarmouth, England, in 2006. The event was sponsored by Potters Holidays.

Draw and results

Winners

Men's singles

Finals

Top half

Bottom half

Women's singles

Men's Pairs

Mixed Pairs

References

External links
Official website

2006 in bowls
World Indoor Bowls Championship